Adam Griger (born 16 March 2004) is a Slovak professional footballer who plays as a forward for Italian  club Cagliari on loan from the Austrian club LASK.

Club career

Zemplín Michalovce
Griger made his Fortuna Liga debut for Zemplín Michalovce against Spartak Trnava on 8 August 2020.

LASK
On 22 December 2020, he joined Linz-based LASK of the Austrian Bundesliga.

Loan to Cagliari
On 1 September 2022, Griger was loaned by Italian club Cagliari, with an option to buy. He was initially assigned to the club's Under-19 (Primavera) squad. He received his first call-up to the senior squad on 5 November 2022 for the game against Südtirol.

International career
In December 2022, Griger was first recognised in a Slovak senior national team nomination and was immediately shortlisted by Francesco Calzona for prospective players' training camp at NTC Senec, even before his nomination for Slovak U21 feeder team.

References

External links
 MFK Zemplín Michalovce official club profile
 
 
 Futbalnet profile

2004 births
Sportspeople from Prešov
Living people
Slovak footballers
Slovakia youth international footballers
Association football forwards
MFK Zemplín Michalovce players
LASK players
FC Juniors OÖ players
Cagliari Calcio players
Slovak Super Liga players
Austrian Football Bundesliga players
2. Liga (Austria) players
Slovak expatriate footballers
Expatriate footballers in Austria
Slovak expatriate sportspeople in Austria
Expatriate footballers in Italy
Slovak expatriate sportspeople in Italy